Fall River Public Schools (FRPS) is a school district headquartered in Fall River, Massachusetts.

Thanks to a long-term effort on the part of the city, the school system has been involved in a consolidation effort, bringing the total number of elementary schools down from twenty-eight as recently as the 1990s to nine today: Spencer Borden Elementary in the southern Highlands, John J. Doran Elementary in the downtown area, Mary L. Fonseca Elementary in the Flint, William S. Greene Elementary near the city's center, Alfred S. Letourneau in the Maplewood neighborhood, Frank M. Silvia Elementary in the far North End, James Tansey Elementary in the middle Highlands, Carlton M. Viveiros Elementary in the South End, and Samuel Watson Elementary in the lower Flint.  Of the old twenty-eight, only Watson, Tansey and Doran remain in their original buildings; Silvia was relocated from its old location downtown to a new building in the northern part of the city, and the other five were rebuilt on the sites of their original schools.  Also, most of the closed school names (except for Wiley and Dubuque) live on in the schools they were consolidated into.  There are three middle schools: Matthew J. Kuss Middle School (which was relocated to the west side of the city), James Morton Middle School (serving the North End), and Edmond P. Talbot Middle School (serving the east side of the city). The site of the former Henry Lord Middle School now serves as an elementary and middle school named Henry Lord Community School.

The city has one public high school, B.M.C. Durfee High School. The school was founded in 1886, replacing an older high school.  The original grand school building was a gift of Mrs. Mary B. Young, in the name of Bradford Matthew Chaloner Durfee, her late son, whose name also graces a dormitory at Yale University. The current school building was opened in 1978, and it was recently announced that a replica of the Durfee Chimes, the original school's red-capped bell tower, will be recreated on the grounds.

Durfee's teams wear black and red (in honor of the old school's black roof and red observatory dome and tower spire), and are called the Hilltoppers, sometimes shortened to Toppers. The nickname dates back to the old school's perch on top of the hill north of the Quequechan River. The school is a member of the Big Three Conference, where it competes with Brockton High School and its longtime natural rival, New Bedford High School.

Schools
Primary schools:
 Spencer Borden Elementary School
 John J. Doran Elementary School
 Mary L. Fonseca Elementary School
 William S. Greene Elementary School
 Alfred S. Letourneau Elementary School
 Frank M. Silvia Elementary School
 James Tansey Elementary School
 Carlton M. Viveiros Elementary School
 Samuel Watson Elementary School
Henry Lord Community School

Middle schools:
 Matthew J. Kuss Middle School
 James Madison Morton Middle School
 Edmond P. Talbot Middle School
 Stone Therapeutic Day Middle School
Henry Lord Community School

High schools:
 B.M.C. Durfee High School
 Resiliency Preparatory School

References

External links

 

Fall River, Massachusetts
School districts in Massachusetts
Education in Bristol County, Massachusetts